Ian Lafrenière is a Canadian politician, who was elected to the National Assembly of Quebec in the 2018 provincial election. He represents the electoral district of Vachon as a member of the Coalition Avenir Québec. Prior to entering provincial politics, he worked as the Public Affairs officer for the Service de police de la Ville de Montréal.

Electoral Record

Cabinet posts

References

Living people
Coalition Avenir Québec MNAs
21st-century Canadian politicians
People from Longueuil
Service de police de la Ville de Montréal
Year of birth missing (living people)